James Nicholl (12 January 1887 – 21 December 1948) was a Scottish footballer who played mainly as an outside left.

After breaking into top-level football with Airdrieonians, in 1910 he moved to England with Middlesbrough where he made 56 appearances, scoring 13 goals, before joining Liverpool in January 1914. He played at Anfield for eighteen months, and featured in the 1914 FA Cup Final (having scored both his team's goals to win the semi-final), but his career in England was ended by the outbreak of World War I – he had a short spell back in Scotland with Hamilton Academical.

References

1887 births
Scottish footballers
Scottish Football League players
English Football League players
Association football outside forwards
Middlesbrough F.C. players
Liverpool F.C. players
Airdrieonians F.C. (1878) players
Hamilton Academical F.C. players
Wishaw Thistle F.C. players
1948 deaths
People from Port Glasgow
Footballers from Inverclyde
Sportspeople from Wishaw
FA Cup Final players
Footballers from North Lanarkshire